Christian Haas (born 18 November 1978) is a German former footballer who played as a forward.

References

External links
 Christian Haas Interview

1978 births
Living people
Footballers from Mannheim
German footballers
Association football forwards
VfB Stuttgart II players
TSG 1899 Hoffenheim players
SSV Reutlingen 05 players
SV Sandhausen players
VfR Aalen players
SpVgg Neckarelz players
3. Liga players
Regionalliga players